Hapi ang Buhay (lit. Life is Happy) is a Philippine television sitcom on Net 25. It is the first sitcom to be produced by Net 25 of the Eagle Broadcasting Corporation, in cooperation with INCinema Productions (the producers of the 2015 indie film Walang Take Two).

Hapi ang Buhay is the sequel-spinoff of Walang Take Two, which was nominated at the 2016 International Filmmaker Festival of World Cinema  for Best Comedy. The first season of Hapi ang Buhay premiered on March 6, 2016 on Net 25, with a weekly air time every Saturday at 4:00 to 5:00 p.m. (PST), with replays on Sundays at 9:00 to 10:00 p.m. (PST), on Net 25. The second season was started on December 10, 2016.

The sitcom is directed by Carlo Jay Ortega Cuevas, who won Best Director of a Foreign Feature Film at the 2016 International Filmmaker Festival of World Cinema  in London for Walang Take Two.

The cast and production team of both Hapi ang Buhay and Walang Take Two all came from various INCinema-produced films, most of them winners from previous editions of the Iglesia Ni Cristo's annual international film competition, the Excellence in Visual Media Awards, with the blessing and guidance from the Iglesia ni Cristo Executive Minister Eduardo Manalo.

Plot
The sitcom is a stark illustration of an urban community, where the main characters deal with relevant social issues. The sitcom has no main protagonist but rather focuses on various characters and their present dilemma.

Part of the sitcom's mainstay cast are the lead characters from Walang Take Two, including the titular Hapi (John Stevenson Tabangay), an aspiring filmmaker, Onyok (Edward Rudolph Flores), his level-headed ally, and the overconfident Caloy (Erbil Escano).

The Indian loan shark, Alfajor (Wilson Tapalla), the mischievous Oblax (Dennis Garcia), and the vain and narcissistic Dondon (Genesis Gomez) also join the regular cast.

Cast
John Stevenson Tabangay as Hapi
Edward Flores as Onyok
Erbil Escaño Jr. as Caloy
Wilson Tapalla as Alfajor
Dennis Rey Garcia as Oneil "Oblax" Balingit Laxamana
Genesis Gomez as Dondon
Kimberly Anne Cordero as Cherry
Luz Cortez as Luz
Teresita Yco as Tess
Darlo Cordero as Jerry
Norman Perez as Chess Player
Marc Aldrin Familiara as Chess Player
Xandrix Rodaje as Xantrix
Jacque Gacita as Jack
Recelle Perez as Aling Susan
Mia Suarez as Esther / Estella
Joyce Gabion as Rowena
Virgilio Reyes as Mang Julian
Althea Guanzon as Thea

References

Philippine comedy television series
Philippine television sitcoms
2016 Philippine television series debuts